The 2009 Cupa României Final was the 71st final of Romania's most prestigious cup competition. The final was played at the Stadionul Tudor Vladimirescu in Târgu Jiu on 13 June 2009 and was contested between Liga I sides FC Timişoara and the defending champions CFR Cluj. The final whistle saw CFR Cluj winning the cup after a three goals to nill margin and also defending last season trophy.

Route to the final

Match details

References

External links
 Official site 

Cupa
2008-09
CFR Cluj matches